The American Basketball Association's Coach of the Year was an annual National Basketball Association (ABA) award given from 1968 to 1976. It was awarded to nine people in total, with two instances of co-Coach of the Year Awards being given out. Larry Brown was the only coach to win it more than once, winning it three times. Only the first two winners of the award ended up winning the ABA Finals that same season.

American Basketball Association awards
American Basketball Association lists